Judge Stanley may refer to:

Arthur Jehu Stanley Jr. (1901–2001), judge of the United States District Court for the District of Kansas
Edwin Monroe Stanley (1909–1971), judge of the United States District Court for the Middle District of North Carolina
William Stanley (Hawaii judge) (1872–1939), judge of the Republic of Hawaii